Attulus talgarensis is a jumping spider species that lives in Kazakhstan and Kyrgyzstan. It was first described in 1993 and named Sitticus talgarensis but was moved to the  genus Attulus in 2017.

References

Spiders described in 1993
Spiders of Central Asia
Fauna of Kyrgyzstan
Sitticini
Taxa named by Wanda Wesołowska